USS LST-579 originally was a United States Navy  built during World War II and in commission from 1944 to 1946 and again in the late 1952. She was sold to the Republic of Singapore Navy and renamed RSS Intrepid (L-203).

Construction and commissioning 
USS LST-579 was laid down on 4 May 1944 at Leavenworth, Kansas, by the Missouri Valley Bridge & Iron Co. She was launched on 22 June 1944 and commissioned on 11 July 1944.

Service in United States Navy

1940s 
During World War II, LST-579 was assigned to the Asiatic-Pacific Campaign and participated in Invasion of Lingayen Gulf from 4 to 18 January 1945. She also participating in the Mindanao Islands landing from 10 to 18 March and 17 to 23 April 1945. LST-579 participated in Balikpapan Operation, the invasion of Borneo on 26 June to 10 July 1945. LST-629 was assigned to China service and was decommissioned on 24 February 1946, assigned for Commander Naval Forces Far East (COMNAVFE) Shipping Control Authority for Japan (SCAJAP) and redesignated as Q073.

1950s–1960s 
LST-629 was transferred to the Military Sea Transportation Service (MSTS), 31 March 1952 and redesignated as USNS T-LST-579.

Service in Republic of Singapore Navy

1970s–1990s 
T-LST-579 was on loan since 1 July 1971 but finally sold to Singapore on 5 December 1975 and was renamed as RSS Intrepid (L-203). Intrepid, along with four other ex-US Navy LSTs sold to Singapore by the US at around the same period of time, served as part of the RSN's 191 Squadron of the 3rd Flotilla, with its main roles being transporting Singapore Army troops and personnel to training facilities abroad (in foreign countries such as Taiwan), rescue-and-aid operations, supply missions as well as for officer-cadet training programmes conducted overseas. 

In 1999, Intrepid, along with RSS Excellence, was deployed to Timor Leste to provide logistic support to Australian-led INTERFET peacekeeping operations.

2000s–2010s 
All four ex-US Navy LSTs are employed as floating sea-defense barricades for Changi Naval Base.

Awards and honors 

 American Campaign Medal
 Asiatic-Pacific Campaign Medal (4 awards)
 World War II Victory Medal
 Philippines Presidential Unit Citation
 Philippines Liberation Medal (2 awards)
 Navy Occupation Service Medal with “Asia” clasp

References

Further reading 
 Navybuddies.com
 US LST Association

LST-542-class tank landing ships
Ships built in Evansville, Indiana
1944 ships
World War II amphibious warfare vessels of the United States
Cold War amphibious warfare vessels of the United States
LST-542-class tank landing ships of the Republic of Singapore Navy
Ships transferred from the United States Navy to the Republic of Singapore Navy